John R. Thelin is an American scholar of higher education in the United States. He is University Research Professor at the University of Kentucky.

Early life
Thelin attended Brown University and the University of California, Berkeley.

Works

A History of American Higher Education
Going to College in the Sixties

References

Living people
Year of birth missing (living people)
Brown University alumni
University of California, Berkeley alumni
University of Kentucky faculty
American historians of education